Pinault's law is a Proto-Indo-European (PIE) phonological rule named after the French Indo-Europeanist Georges-Jean Pinault who discovered it.

Examples can be seen in the formation of imperfective verbs by appending  to the stem.
Compare:

 PIE root  'to say' → imperfective  'to be saying' (cf. Ancient Greek εἴρω 'to tell')
 PIE root  'to plow' → imperfective  'to be plowing' (cf. Old Irish airid 'to be plowing')
 PIE root  'to spin' → imperfective '' 'to be spinning' (cf. Old Irish sniïd). Here the laryngeal  is not deleted since it is preceded by a vowel.

References
 
 
 

Proto-Indo-European language
Sound laws